Mount Ilas Mapulu is a limestone mountain near Berau, East Kalimantan, Borneo. It is the type locality of the pitcher plant species Nepenthes mapuluensis, which is named after it.

References

berau Regency
Ilas Mapulu
Landforms of East Kalimantan